Antonio Bertrán Panadés (18 November 1933 – 21 March 2008) was a Spanish professional road cyclist.

Major results

1956
 2nd Overall Vuelta a la Comunidad Valenciana
 2nd Trofeo Masferrer
1958
 1st Stage 3 Volta a Catalunya
1959
 1st  Overall Euskal Bizikleta
 1st GP Pascuas
 3rd Campeonato Vasco Navarro de Montaña
 8th Overall Vuelta a Andalucía
1960
 1st Trofeo Jaumendreu
 1st Stage 1 Vuelta a Andalucía
 1st Stage 5 Vuelta a la Comunidad Valenciana
 5th Overall Volta a Catalunya
1961
 5th Overall Vuelta a la Comunidad Valenciana
1st Stage 4
1962
 2nd Overall Vuelta a la Comunidad Valenciana
1st Stage 1b
 3rd Campeonato Vasco Navarro de Montaña
1963
 1st Stage 5 Volta a Catalunya
1964
 6th Trofeo Masferrer
 10th Overall Vuelta a España
1965
 1st Trofeo Masferrer
 1st Stage 5 Vuelta a la Comunidad Valenciana
 2nd Overall Setmana Catalana de Ciclisme
1st Stage 2
1966
 1st Stage 4 Vuelta a la Comunidad Valenciana
 10th Overall Vuelta a Andalucía
1st Stage 7

References

External links
 

1933 births
2008 deaths
Spanish male cyclists
Sportspeople from Eibar
Cyclists from the Basque Country (autonomous community)